Raya-varam is a village in the district of Mahbubnagar in the state of Telangana, India.

References

Villages in Mahbubnagar district